Romano Bobone was an Italian cardinal. He was made cardinal deacon of S.R.C. in 928 by Pope Leo VI.

See also
Catholic Church in Italy

References

External links
Dizionario di erudizione storico-ecclesiastica da S. Pietro sino ai nostri giorni Vol.V, 1743

10th-century Italian cardinals